Spike is the first solo album by Japanese guitarist Agata of the band Melt-Banana. It was released on Tzadik in May 2004.

The album consists mainly of solo guitar and sound effects. Agata is known for creating strange soundscapes with his guitar and often sounds nothing like a guitar. This album could be seen as an extra addition to Melt-Banana's discography as it shares many similarities to his guitarwork in Melt-Banana. The album also sounds similar to "Outro For Cell-Scape" on Melt-Banana's previous album Cell-Scape, with several songs (e.g. "Frontside Boardslide Shovit out" or "Nollie Crooked Grind") being named after popular skateboard tricks.

Track listing
Stealth – 0:31
Ice Driver – 1:02
Splinter - 0:16
Animal Instinct – 0:25
Frontside Boardslide Shovit Out – 0:18
Pinger – 0:45
Armillary Sphere – 1:22
Ecco Feedback – 1:48
Bungy – 1:15
Rescued To Be Shot And Killed – 0:30
Tailgrab – 0:46
38915 Bubbles – 1:01
Team Pocket Pickering – 1:18
Starfish – 2:39
Cable Has No Name – 1:59
Vertigo (Recti-Head) – 1:17
Switch Life – 1:01
Twilight Sinking – 4:24
Invaded – 0:22
Nollie Crooked Grind – 0:30
Piezo Sparker – 0:50
Bone Puzzle – 0:52
Nyazilla – 1:39
Inokashira Zoo – 3:04
Air Nozzles And Echoes Reset Live – 10:05

Personnel
 Guitar / Sound Effects: Agata
 Recording Information: Studio Museum, Tokyo, Japan

2004 albums
Tzadik Records albums